Tiyasha is a 2013 Bengali film directed by Animesh Roy starring Saswata Chatterjee and Chandrayee Ghosh. The story of the film revolves around modern day relationships.

Plot 
This is a story of romance and love. This shows the journey of a man Sudipto (Saswata Chatterjee) defying the odds in maintaining a healthy and a happy family. The story revolves around Sudipto and Riya (Chandrayee Ghosh) and Tojo (Soham BasuRoychowdhury), their son.

Cast 
 Saswata Chatterjee as Sudipto
 Chandrayee Ghosh as Riya
 RJ Shekhar as Shekhar
 Soham BasuRoychowdhury as Tojo
 Jayanti Bhowmick as a friend

Production

Casting 
In this film Saswata Chatterjee portrayed an unsuccessful man's character. Chandrayee Ghosh played the character of a radio jockey. Ghosh's last movie before Tiyasha was Necklace, directed by Sekhar Das, which released in 2011. Ghosh told in an interview—

Filming 
The shooting of the film began on 24 May 2013.

Soundtrack 
The soundtrack of the movie involves collaborations from music directors Aninda Bose and Debanjalee Banerjee, Avik Chaudhuri and Sunidhi Chauhan, Anwesha Datta Gupta, Chandrayee Ghosh, Rupankar Bagchi and Argha Dutta.

Release and reception 
The film released on 20 September 2013 in West Bengal, India.

References 

Bengali-language Indian films
2010s Bengali-language films
2013 films